Brycchan Carey (born 23 June 1967) is a British academic and author with research interests in the environmental humanities and the cultural history of slavery and abolition. He was educated at Goldsmiths' College, University of London and Queen Mary, University of London, where he completed a doctorate on "The Rhetoric of Sensibility: Argument, Sentiment, and Slavery in the Late Eighteenth Century". He lectured at Kingston University from 2000 before taking up the role of Professor of English at Northumbria University in 2016.

Carey has authored and edited several books and many articles on slavery and abolition. These include From Peace to Freedom: Quaker Rhetoric and the Birth of American Antislavery, 1658-1761 (2012) and British Abolitionism and the Rhetoric of Sensibility: Writing, Sentiment, and Slavery, 1760-1807 (2005), as well as an edition of The Interesting Narrative of the Life of Olaudah Equiano, or Gustavus Vassa, The African (2018).

His published research in the environmental humanities includes work on bull-baiting in the eighteenth-century, ecocritical essays on Gilbert White and Oliver Goldsmith, and a collection of essays on birds in eighteenth-century literature (2020). In 2022, he was awarded a prestigious three-year British Academy/Wolfson Professorship to research The Parish Revolution: Parochial Origins of Global Conservationism.

Carey makes his academic research available to a broad public audience through a website first created in the 1990s. This is noted for its information on Olaudah Equiano and Ignatius Sancho and also offers biographies of many British abolitionists, full texts of eighteenth and nineteenth-century antislavery poems, and information and literary resources for several places including Cornwall and Cambridgeshire.

Carey is an active participant in British scholarly societies. He is currently President of the British Society for Eighteenth-Century Studies. He was a founder and, in 2011-2014, the first president of The Literary London Society. He was President of the UK and Ireland branch of the Association for the Study of Literature and Environment from 2015 to 2019. He is a fellow and, since 2021, a Council Member of the Linnean Society of London.

Publications

 (Edited with Sayre Greenfield and Anne Milne)

 (Edited with Nicole N. Aljoe and Thomas W. Krise)

 (Edited with an introduction, notes, and index)

 (Edited with Geoffrey Plank)

 (Edited with Peter Kitson)

 (Edited with Markman Ellis and Sara Salih)

References

External links
Brycchan Carey's website
Brycchan Carey at Northumbria University

1967 births
Living people
Academics of Northumbria University
British historians
Fellows of the Linnean Society of London